John Lindsay, 19th Earl of Crawford and 3rd Earl of Lindsay (died December 1713) was a Scottish peer and politician.

Life

He was born before 1672, the eldest son of William Lindsay, 18th Earl of Crawford, and succeeded to the earldoms in 1698 on the death of his father. His mother was Lady Mary Johnstone.

On 6 March 1698, he succeeded to the title of 12th Lord Lindsay of Byres. He married Emilia Stuart daughter of James Stuart, Lord Doune around 1700.
Trained as a lawyer, in 1702 he rose to the position of Privy Counsellor for Scotland. He was Colonel of the "nd Troop of Horse in the Grenadier Guards from 1704 to 1714.

Following the Treaty of Union in May 1707, he was elected as one of the first representative peers for Scotland (to serve in the new United Kingdom), and served until September 1710.

He died in London on 4 January 1714. He is buried in the family vault of Ceres, Fife churchyard in central Fife. He was succeeded by his oldest surviving son, John Lindsay, his first-born son, William, having died.

1713 deaths
British Life Guards officers
19
Scottish representative peers
John
Year of birth unknown
Lindsay, John Lindsay, 3rd Earl of